Gosbeck is a village and civil parish in the Mid Suffolk district of Suffolk in eastern England. Located around five miles north of Ipswich, in 2005 its population was 220.

The parish contains Gosbeck Wood, an ancient woodland and SSSI.

References

External links

Villages in Suffolk
Civil parishes in Suffolk
Mid Suffolk District